Nicolas Boulay (born August 18, 1989) is a Canadian football linebacker who is currently a free agent. He most recently played for the Ottawa Redblacks of the Canadian Football League (CFL). He was drafted 30th overall in the 2013 CFL Draft by the Alouettes and signed with the team on May 13, 2013. He played CIS football with the Sherbrooke Vert et Or.

College career
Boulay played four years with the University of Sherbrooke Vert et Or. He was named the team's defensive player of the year following a remarkable season in which his 58.5 tackles ranked fourth in the Quebec conference and sixth in the country. Boulay recorded two quarterback sacks in his nine games played in 2012 and was voted defensive captain that year.

Professional career
In the 2013 CFL Draft, Boulay was drafted by the Montreal Alouettes of the Canadian Football League. He was selected in the 4th round with the 3rd pick (30th overall). He signed with the Als on May 13, 2013.

He signed with the Ottawa Redblacks in February 2019. He played in ten games for the team in 2019 and was released by the Redblacks on January 23, 2020.

Personal life
Nicolas's brother Mathieu Boulay was also a professional football player in the Canadian Football League.

References

External links
Ottawa Redblacks bio
Montreal Alouettes bio

1989 births
Living people
People from Magog, Quebec
Players of Canadian football from Quebec
Sherbrooke Vert et Or football players
Montreal Alouettes players
Canadian football linebackers
Ottawa Redblacks players